George Greenwood (1911–1988) was an international speedway rider from England.

Speedway career 
In 1929, Greenwood was the Leeds track champion at the age of 17, and soon became a major star around the Northern tracks. His form soon attracted the attention of Wembley Lions, who signed him in 1929, for the 1930 season. He was one of the first riders recognised as developing team riding (where both riders attempt to hold the front of the race together), forming a successful partnership with Harry Whitfield.

In 1930, he was selected for Great British team to tour New Zealand. It was the first team to leave the shores and consisted of Greenwood, Whitfield, Jim Kempster, Roger Frogley, Frank Bond and Squib Burton. He was later the captain of the Nottingham team and became the 1936 Provincial League Riders' champion and topped the averages during the 1936 Provincial Speedway League.

Personal life
He married Ivy Elliston in 1937 and after World War II, he managed a motor export shop (owned by Wembley speedway manager Alec Jackson) in Harrow Road, Kensal Green, London and was also part of the Wembley Lions management team.

Players cigarette cards
Greenwood is listed as number 16 of 50 in the 1930s Player's cigarette card collection.

References 

1911 births
1988 deaths
British speedway riders
Hackney Wick Wolves riders
Leeds Lions riders
Middlesbrough Bears riders
Wembley Lions riders